Anatoli  Vladimirovich Romashin (1931–2000) was a Soviet and Russian film and theater actor, director. He won the USSR State Prize (1977) and was a People's Artist of the RSFSR (1982).

Biography 
Anatoli Romashin was born in Leningrad on 1 January 1931. His father was a Russian, mother was an Estonian. His brother Vladimir (1932-2012) was an opera singer.
He graduated from the Moscow Art Theatre School (course of Victor Stanitsyn) in 1959. Since 1959 - an actor Mayakovsky Theatre.

The actor became widely recognized after the release of the 1974 Elem Klimov's film Agony, where Romashin played the role of Nicholas II.

In recent years, he played in the  under the directorship of Sergei Prokhanov.

According to critics, Romashin was the perfect actor for the role of a Russian intelligent. His artistic career included a lot of such roles.

Death
He was killed in an accident on the evening of August 8, 2000 near the town of Pushkino, Moscow Oblast   actor was impaled by a huge old pine, that he was trying to chainsaw on his dacha. He was buried on the Vagankovo Cemetery. Six months later the dacha was destroyed by fire.

Selected filmography
The Hyperboloid of Engineer Garin (1965) as  Dr. Wolf
The Seventh Companion (Седьмой спутник, 1967) as white officer
Strong with Spirit (Сильные духом, 1967) as Oberleutnant
Hit Back (Ответный ход, 1971) as  Major General Nefedov
Agony (Агония, 1974) as  emperor Nicholas II
An Unfinished Piece for Mechanical Piano (Неоконченная пьеса для механического пианино, 1977) as  Gerasim Kuzmich Petrin
Where were you, Odysseus? (Где ты был, Одиссей?, 1978) as SS Sturmbannführer Karl Ehrlich
Anna Pavlova (Анна Павлова, 1983) as Alexandre Benois
And Then Where Were None (Десять негритят, 1987) as Doctor Armstrong
Friend (Друг, 1987) as Friend's owner

References

External links

1931 births
2000 deaths
Russian film directors
People's Artists of the RSFSR
Honored Artists of the RSFSR
Soviet male stage actors
Russian male stage actors
Recipients of the USSR State Prize
Accidental deaths in Russia
Moscow Art Theatre School alumni
Male actors from Saint Petersburg
Burials at Vagankovo Cemetery